Aleksander Reed Skarlatos (born October 10, 1992) is an American former Army National Guard soldier who, along with Spencer Stone, Anthony Sadler and three others, stopped a gunman on a Paris-bound train travelling from Amsterdam via Brussels in August 2015. He was awarded the United States Army's Soldier's Medal from U.S. President Barack Obama. All six received France's highest decoration, the Chevalier of the Legion of Honour, from French president François Hollande. The Americans were also awarded the medal of the city of Arras.

Skarlatos competed on season 21 of ABC's Dancing with the Stars with pro dancer Lindsay Arnold as his partner. They finished in third place. Skarlatos, along with his friends, portrayed themselves in the Clint Eastwood-directed movie The 15:17 to Paris, based on their autobiography, which was written with reporter Jeffrey Stern. He was the Republican nominee for Oregon's 4th congressional district in the 2020 United States House of Representatives elections, but was defeated by incumbent Democrat Peter DeFazio. He ran again to represent Oregon in the 4th congressional district in the 2022 House elections, but was defeated by Democratic state Labor Commmissioner Val Hoyle.

Early life 
Aleksander Reed Skarlatos was born in Castro Valley, California. His father, Emanuel Skarlatos, immigrated to the United States from Germany as a child. He was raised in Sacramento County, California, where he first met Spencer Stone and Anthony Sadler while attending a parochial school in Fair Oaks. Skarlatos graduated from Roseburg High School and attended Umpqua Community College.

2015 Thalys train attack 

On August 21, 2015, Skarlatos, Anthony Sadler and United States Air Force serviceman Spencer Stone, high school friends from Skarlatos' former home of Carmichael, California, were traveling together on the Thalys high-speed train 9364 from Amsterdam bound for Paris via Brussels during a European vacation. Skarlatos was returning from serving in Afghanistan. A 25-year-old Moroccan, Ayoub El-Khazzani, exited the train car's toilet, armed with an AKM assault rifle, a Luger pistol, and a box knife. He carried magazines holding 270 rounds of ammunition for the assault rifle in a rucksack. 

Two passengers, a Frenchman, "Damien A.," and 51-year-old Mark Moogalian, an American expatriate living in Paris, tried to disarm the gunman. Moogalian wrested the rifle from him but was shot by the Luger while trying to protect his wife. Stone ran toward and attacked the gunman but was slashed while trying to subdue him. Arriving next to the struggle, Skarlatos grabbed the pistol out of El-Khazzani's hand, then picked up the rifle, striking the terrorist in the head with its muzzle. Sixty-two-year-old British businessman Chris Norman also helped subdue the gunman. Though badly cut, Stone - who received wrestling training in the Air Force - choked El-Khazzani until he was unconscious. El-Khazzani was tied up and then Stone, who also had some military medical training, delivered lifesaving assistance to Moogalian by compressing an exposed, bleeding artery. 

El-Khazzani and three of his alleged accomplices were tried in November 2020. Moogalian, Stone, Sadler, and Skarlatos were scheduled to testify, but Stone's testimony was delayed because he was hospitalized in France for undisclosed reasons. Skarlatos gave prime credit for preventing what could have been a mass killing to Stone, saying, "I do not feel like a hero because we were just doing what we had to to survive. I think Spencer is probably a hero because he was the first one" to take down El-Khazzani. "We only got involved because Spencer needed our help."  El Khazzani was sentenced to life in prison for attempted murders and conspiracy to commit an act of terrorism. His accomplices were found guilty as well: Bilal Chatra was sentenced to 27 years in prison; Rédouane El Amrani Ezzerrifi was sentenced to seven years, and Mohamed Bakkali was sentenced to 25 years. Abdelhamid Abaaoud was the mastermind of the train attack, as well as an attack in Brussels that killed 31 people, and a series of attacks in November 2015 that killed 130 in Paris, including a bombing at the night club Bataclan that killed 90 people. Abaaoud was killed in a police raid of his hideout in Saint-Denis a few days later.

International recognition 

After the events of August 22, 2015, Skarlatos and his friends received international attention for their actions in thwarting the attack. French president François Hollande awarded Skarlatos, Stone, and Sadler, as well as Norman, France's highest decoration, Knights of the Legion of Honour (Chevaliers de la Légion d'honneur). Hollande said the men "faced [off] with terror" and that they "gave us a lesson in courage, in will, and therefore in hope." French Interior Minister Bernard Cazeneuve and British Prime Minister David Cameron praised the men for their bravery. 

The White House expressed gratitude for "courage and quick thinking of several passengers, including U.S. service members, who selflessly subdued the attacker..." U.S. President Barack Obama telephoned the three Americans, thanking them for their heroic actions. General Philip M. Breedlove of the U.S. European Command in Stuttgart, added his praise, calling the three Americans heroes for their actions which "clearly illustrate the courage and commitment our young men and women have all the time, whether they are on duty or on leave."

Kevin Johnson, mayor of Sacramento, California, held a parade to honor Skarlatos, Sadler, Stone, and the victims of the September 11 attacks. Megyn Kelly of Fox News Channel's The Kelly File asked Skarlatos whether he had a different appreciation of the 9/11 terrorist attacks. "I feel so much more connected to terrorist attacks and things like that, and victims of terrorist attacks," Skarlatos said. "That easily could have been us if any one of six or seven things went a different way."

Military and media career

Military 
Skarlatos joined the Oregon Army National Guard in 2012, achieving the rank of Specialist. He completed a nine-month deployment in Afghanistan with the National Guard's 186th Infantry Regiment, 41st Infantry Brigade Combat Team in 2015. The acting adjutant general of Oregon Guard referred to Skarlatos as "a true citizen soldier who displayed the courage each of us would hope to find in ourselves." A month prior to the terrorist event on the high-speed train in France, Skarlatos had reenlisted for an additional twoyears. He left military service in November 2017.

Television 
In October 2016, it was announced that Skarlatos, Spencer Stone and Anthony Sadler would make an appearance on Who Wants to Be a Millionaire as a part of the show's special "Hometown Heroes" week which would premiere on October 31, 2016.

Dancing with the Stars 
Skarlatos was a competitor in season 21 of Dancing with the Stars. He was partnered with professional dancer Lindsay Arnold. He said that he was inspired to participate on the show by Noah Galloway, a soldier who was on the previous season of the series. Skarlatos and Arnold made it to the finals of the show and finished in third place.

Film 

In July 2017, it was announced that Clint Eastwood would direct the upcoming biographical film titled after Stone, Skarlatos and Sadler's memoir, starring them, along with actresses Jenna Fischer and Judy Greer. Filming began on July 11, 2017. The film was released in the United States on February 9, 2018. The film received a score of 23% on Rotten Tomatoes, a review aggregation website.

Political campaigns 
Skarlatos ran for Douglas County Commissioner in his home state of Oregon in the 2018 midterm elections, but he lost to businessman Tom Kress. Skarlatos said on election night that his opponent's 2% lead made the race still incredibly close, continuing, "We have a lot of great people and I think we're going to have a better response from the exterior of the county, so I'm still very optimistic." He wasn't surprised by Kress's lead, saying, "He's outspending us by 2 to 1 and took his campaign really negative."

2020 U.S. House campaign 

In 2019, Skarlatos announced that he was running as a candidate in the 2020 elections to represent Oregon's 4th congressional district in the United States House of Representatives as a Republican.

Skarlatos won the Republican primary, on May 19, 2020, defeating Nelson Ijih with 86% of the vote. Skarlatos lost the general election to incumbent Democratic congressman Peter DeFazio in the 2020 November general election, finishing with 46.2% of the vote against DeFazio's 51.5%. By several weeks before the election, Skarlatos had outraised his opponent by about $500,000, mostly from smaller independent individual donations plus larger individual donations, with DeFazio raising more PAC money.

2022 U.S. House campaign 

In May 2021, Skarlatos announced that he would run again for Oregon's 4th congressional district in the 2022 United States House of Representatives elections. He was unopposed in the Republican primary.

After redistricting for the 2022 election, the 4th District contained a higher percentage of Democratic-leaning voters than before. DeFazio announced in late 2021 that he would retire. Oregon Labor Commissioner Val Hoyle announced that she would run for the seat and was endorsed by DeFazio. Hoyle won the May 17 Democratic primary. Skarlatos faced Hoyle in the November 8 general election but lost his election bid.

Personal life 
In September 2018, Skarlatos became an honorary naturalized French citizen, along with Stone and Sadler. A naturalization ceremony was held in Sacramento in January 2019. Skarlatos was raised a Presbyterian, but is now a member of a Lutheran church.

Awards and decorations 

Received the bravery medal of the city of Arras, France.

Bibliography 
 The 15:17 To Paris (2016)

Filmography

References

External links 

 Campaign website
 .
 Alek Skarlatos on Dancing with the Stars

1992 births
2015 Thalys train attack
21st-century American male actors
American ballroom dancers
American gun rights activists
American male dancers
American male non-fiction writers
American people of Greek descent
American political candidates
Candidates in the 2022 United States House of Representatives elections
Chevaliers of the Légion d'honneur
Christians from California
Christians from Oregon
Living people
Naturalized citizens of France
Oregon Republicans
Participants in American reality television series
People from Fair Oaks, California
People from Roseburg, Oregon
Recipients of the Soldier's Medal
United States Army soldiers
American Lutherans
Former Presbyterians
United States Army personnel of the War in Afghanistan (2001–2021)